Psalm 91 is the 91st psalm of the Book of Psalms, beginning in English in the King James Version: "He that dwelleth in the secret place of the most High shall abide under the shadow of the Almighty." In Latin, it is known as 'Qui habitat". As a psalm of protection, it is commonly invoked in times of hardship. Though no author is mentioned in the Hebrew text of this psalm, Jewish tradition ascribes it to Moses, with David compiling it in his Book of Psalms. The Septuagint translation attributes it to David.

In the slightly different numbering system used in the Greek Septuagint and Latin Vulgate translations of the Bible, this psalm is Psalm 90.

The psalm forms a regular part of Jewish, Catholic, Eastern Orthodox, Lutheran, Anglican and other Protestant liturgies. The complete psalm and selected verses have often been set to music, notably by Heinrich Schütz and Felix Mendelssohn, who used verses for his motet Denn er hat seinen Engeln befohlen. The psalm has been paraphrased in hymns.

Text
The psalm was originally written in the Hebrew language. It is divided into 16 verses.

Hebrew Bible version
Following is the Hebrew text of Psalm 91:

King James Version
 He that dwelleth in the secret place of the most High shall abide under the shadow of the Almighty.
 Surely He shall deliver thee from the snare of the fowler, and from the noisome pestilence.
 He shall cover thee with His feathers, and under His wings shalt thou trust: His truth shall be thy shield and buckler.
 Thou shalt not be afraid for the terror by night; nor for the arrow that flieth by day;
 Nor for the pestilence that walketh in darkness; nor for the destruction that wasteth at noonday.
 A thousand shall fall at thy side, and ten thousand at thy right hand; but it shall not come nigh thee.
 Only with thine eyes shalt thou behold and see the reward of the wicked.
 There shall no evil befall thee, neither shall any plague come nigh thy dwelling.
 For He shall give His angels charge over thee, to keep thee in all thy ways.
 They shall bear thee up in their hands, lest thou dash thy foot against a stone.
 Thou shalt tread upon the lion and adder: the young lion and the dragon shalt thou trample under feet.
 Because he hath set his love upon Me, therefore will I deliver him: I will set him on high, because he hath known My name.
 He shall call upon Me, and I will answer him: I will be with him in trouble; I will deliver him, and honour him.
 With long life will I satisfy him, and show him My salvation.

Verse 2 
 I will say of the Lord, "He is my refuge and my fortress;
 My God, in Him I will trust".
Kirkpatrick notes that the use of the first person in this verse and the first part of verse 9, followed in each case by the second person, is "somewhat perplexing". Many commentators argue that the text is corrupt and amend it. Kirkpartick argues that "The two occurrences of the first person mutually support one another. If the interpretation suggested above is adopted [that the text is addressed to Israel], Psalm 91:1-2 [and] Psalm 91:9a will be the profession of the Psalmist’s faith, on the strength of which he addresses to Israel the comforting words of Psalm 91:3 ff. [and] Psalm 91:9b ff."

Background and themes
The Midrash states that Psalm 91 was composed by Moses on the day he completed the building of the Tabernacle in the desert. The verses describe Moses' own experience entering the Tabernacle: "He that dwelleth in the secret place of the most High shall abide under the shadow of the Almighty".  Midrash Tehillim and Zohar teach that Moses composed this psalm while ascending into the cloud hovering over Mount Sinai, at which time he recited these words as protection from the angels of destruction.

In Jewish thought, Psalm 91 conveys the themes of God's protection and rescue from danger. The Talmud (Shevu'ot 15b) records opinions calling this psalm the "song of evil spirits" and the "song of plagues" ("shir shel pega'im" and "shir shel nega'im," respectively), for "one who recites it with faith in God will be helped by Him in time of danger". Since the times of the Geonim, this psalm was recited to drive away demons and evil spirits. According to midrashim, the psalm references many types of demons that threaten man, including the "Terror", "Arrow", "Pestilence", and "Destruction" mentioned in verses 5–6. The psalm was written in amulets by both Jews and Christians from the Late Antique period. According to the Talmud (Shevu'ot 15b), the subsequent verse, verse 7 ("A thousand shall fall at your side," etc.) is a reference to the demons which would perish upon recitation of this psalm. In the same vein, Psalm 91 was included as one of the "Four Psalms Against Demons" in Dead Sea Scroll 11QapocrPs, the other three psalms being previously unknown, which are thought to have been used by the Qumran community for exorcisms.

Modern-day Christians see the psalm as a source of comfort and protection, even in times of suffering. Commentator Alexander Kirkpatrick holds that 

Verse 13, in the King James Version "Thou shalt tread upon the lion and adder: the young lion and the dragon shalt thou trample under feet", was the origin of the iconography of Christ treading on the beasts, seen in the Late Antique period and revived in Carolingian and Anglo-Saxon art.

Uses

Judaism 
Psalm 91 is prominent in Jewish liturgy and ritual. It is recited during the Pesukei Dezimra in the Shabbat, Yom Tov, and - in many communities - on Hoshana Rabbah morning services. It is also recited after the evening prayer on Motza'ei Shabbat and during the nightly Bedtime Shema. In each of these prayers, verse 16 is said twice. According to Machzor Vitry, the verse is doubled to complete the spelling of a name of God. 

Psalm 91 is recited seven times during a burial ceremony. As the casket bearers approach the grave, they stop every few feet, repeating the psalm. In the case of the burial of a woman, the casket bearers do not stop the procession, but they do repeat the psalm seven times.

Verse 11 of the psalm is recited after the liturgical poem Shalom Aleichem at the Friday night meal.

Psalm 91 is often recited as a prayer for protection. Some say it before embarking on a journey.

New Testament
Verses 11 and 12 are quoted by the devil during the temptation of Christ in Matthew 4:6 and Luke .
Verse 13 is quoted in Luke .

Western Christianity
In Western Christianity it is often sung or recited during services of Compline.
The psalm forms part of the Benedictine rite of the daily evening prayer Compline. After the Reform of the Roman Breviary by Pope Pius X it was only used on Sundays and Solemnities. In the Liturgy of the Hours it is part of Compline on the eve of Sunday and Solemnities.

In the Revised Common Lectionary (Year C) the psalm is appointed for the first Sunday in Lent, linking it to the temptation of Christ, where the devil quotes this psalm.

In the medieval Western Church it was included in the readings for Good Friday.

Eastern Orthodoxy
In Eastern Orthodoxy it is used in the prayers of the Sixth Hour, at Great Compline, and also in the Memorial Service for the departed (Pannikhida).

Musical settings

Hymns
The 1972 hymn in German, "Wer unterm Schutz des Höchsten steht", is a paraphrase of Psalm 91. "On Eagle's Wings" is a hymn composed by Michael Joncas in 1979, loosely based on this psalm.

Classical
Dmitry Bortniansky set Psalm 91 as Concerto No. 21 of his Choruses in Old Church Slavonic, Zhyvyi v pomoshshi Vyshnjago ("He That Dwelleth"). Felix Mendelssohn composed an eight-part motet based on verse 11 in German, Denn er hat seinen Engeln befohlen, and included it in his 1846 oratorio Elijah. Movement 9 of Benjamin Britten's The Company of Heaven, a major choral composition with soloists and orchestra first aired in 1937, sets verses 1, 9–13 for a cappella choir. with the densest vocal texture within the work for eight voices.

Polish composer Józef Elsner set the three last verses of as an offertorio, Quoniam in me speravit, Op.30, published c. 1829.

In popular culture

Psalm 91 is known as the Soldier's Psalm or Soldier's Prayer. Camouflage bandanas imprinted with the psalm are often distributed to US troops.

Sinéad O'Connor's debut album The Lion and the Cobra includes a recitation of verses 11–13 in Irish by singer Enya on the song "Never Get Old".

Canadian metal band Cryptopsy references verses 5–8 of the psalm in their song "The Pestilence That Walketh in Darkness" on their 2005 album Once Was Not.

Brazilian-American metal band Soulfly recited the psalm in Portuguese on the bonus track "Salmo-91" on their fifth album Dark Ages.

The Jerry Garcia Band quotes verses 5–6 in its song "My Sisters and Brothers".

Madonna references Psalm 91 in "Virgin Mary (Intro)" on her 2012 The MDNA Tour.

References

Sources

External links

 
 
 Text of Psalm 91 according to the 1928 Psalter
 Psalms Chapter 91 text in Hebrew and English, mechon-mamre.org
 Psalm 91 – The Assurance of those Who Trust in God text and detailed commentary, enduringword.com
 You who dwell in the shelter of the Most High, who abide in the shade of the Almighty text and footnotes, usccb.org United States Conference of Catholic Bishops
 Psalm 91:1 introduction and text, biblestudytools.com
 Psalm 91 / Refrain: Bless the Lord, O my soul. Church of England
 Psalm 91 at biblegateway.com
 Hymns for Psalm 91 hymnary.org
 Safe in the Shelter of the Most High Christian Podcast on Psalm 91

091
Shacharit for Shabbat and Yom Tov